P. Veldurai is an Indian politician and Member of the Legislative Assembly (MLA). He has been elected to the Tamil Nadu legislative assembly as an Indian National Congress candidate from Cheranmadevi constituency in 1996 and 2006 elections.

Controversy

P. Veldurai courted controversy during his tenure as MLA as in 2011 the Supreme Court held that his election from Cheranmahadevi constituency in May 2006 was illegal, null and void, as he was a registered government civil contractor at the time of filing nominations and his registration had not been cancelled as per law. Veldurai was asked to repay ₹ 21.58 lakh that he'd drawn as salary, which he contested in the court of law. Finally, he was subject of a landmark judgement of the Madras High Court on 26 February 2019 that held that Members of Parliament (MPs) as well as MLAs are liable to be asked to repay salaries and other emoluments, along with penalty, if a court of law declares their election to be illegal, null and void either before or after the completion of their tenure.

Electoral performance

References 

Indian National Congress politicians from Tamil Nadu
Living people
Tamil Nadu MLAs 1996–2001
Tamil Nadu MLAs 2006–2011
Year of birth missing (living people)
Tamil Maanila Congress politicians